Little Heath is a village in the civil parish of Audlem, Cheshire, England. It is located to the north of Audlem, between Lonk Land and Audlem Road, the latter being part of today's A529 road.

References 

Villages in Cheshire